Celestino Vietti Ramus (born 13 October 2001) is an Italian motorcycle rider competing in Moto2 for Mooney VR46 Racing Team. He is also a member of Valentino Rossi's VR46 Academy.

Career

Junior career
In 2018 he competed full-time in the 2018 FIM CEV Moto3 Junior World Championship, scoring a second place in Barcelona, and finishing the season 10th overall, with 52 points.

Moto3 World Championship

2018–2020
In  he graduated to the Moto3 World Championship where he replaced Enea Bastianini in the Estrella Galicia team.

He made his Grand Prix racing debut as injury replacement for fellow VR46 Academy member Nicolò Bulega at the Japanese Grand Prix. A week later he scored his first career podium in Moto3 at Phillip Island, and finished off the season with a 10th place in Valencia. Vietti scored 24 points total, six more than Bulega, despite taking part in 14 races less.

Following his impressive debut performances, Vietti competed full-time in the 2019 Moto3 World Championship, with Bulega moving up to the Moto2 category. Vietti hit the ground running, scoring regular top 10 points at almost every weekend, grabbing three 3rd places in Jerez, Barcelona, and Motegi, scoring 135 points total, finishing sixth overall in the championship standings, and winning rookie of the year.

Vietti started the 2020 Moto3 World Championship season well, with a third place in Jerez in the third race of the year, earning Vietti his fifth career podium in Moto3, all third places. A month later in Austria, Vietti scored his first victory in the category, followed by a second place in Misano, and another victory in France. Overall Vietti closed a strong year with two victories, four podiums, 146 points, and a fifth place finish in the final standings, in his final year of Moto3.

Moto2 World Championship

2021–present
Following Nicolò Bulega's performances, Vietti was promoted to Moto2 for the 2021 season, partnering Marco Bezzecchi at Sky Racing Team VR46. Vietti slowly improved as the season went on, with his three best results coming at the last three races of the year, fourth in Misano, sixth in Portimao, and fourth in Valencia. He finished the season with 89 points, good for 12th in the final standings, and third among rookies, behind Raúl Fernández, and Ai Ogura.

Vietti was partnered by Niccolò Antonelli at Mooney VR46 Racing team for the 2022 Moto2 World Championship.

Career statistics

Grand Prix motorcycle racing

By season

By class

Races by year
(key) (Races in bold indicate pole position, races in italics indicate fastest lap)

 Half points awarded as less than two thirds of the race distance (but at least three full laps) was completed.

References

External links

2001 births
Living people
Italian motorcycle racers
Moto3 World Championship riders
Sportspeople from the Metropolitan City of Turin
Moto2 World Championship riders